Ischnura genei, the island bluetail damselfly, is a species of damselfly that replaces the blue-tailed damselfly on some Mediterranean islands (e.g., Corsica , Sardinia, and Sicily where the two species are not known to coexist). It is a small and slender damselfly that tends to be smaller and daintier than the common bluetail. Its main distinguishing features include a black abdomen, which in males carries a striking blue tail-light on S8. Some female colour forms, too, have a blue tail-light on S8, but it tends to be interrupted by a black mark on either end. In some other female colour forms S8 is rusty brown. The male's pterostigma is bi-coloured (as it is in Ischnura elegans). In Malta, this species is still frequent and breeds, but it is endangered by habitat loss.

References

Sciberras, A.; Sciberras, J. and Magro D. (2007)  "A Celebration of Dragonflies". The Malta Independent. November 19, pp. 8–9.

Ischnura
Damselflies of Europe
Insects described in 1842
Taxa named by Jules Pierre Rambur